Van Leigh Tiffin, Jr. (born August 3, 1988) is a former American football kicker. He was signed by the Cleveland Browns as an undrafted free agent in 2010. He played college football at Alabama. Named for his father, he is called Leigh to distinguish him from Van Tiffin.

College career
Tiffin, who wore number 99 for the Alabama Crimson Tide, got his chance to kick as a freshman following a groin injury to starting kicker Jamie Christensen. Tiffin was a hero, kicking the game-winning 47–yard field goal, in Alabama's 13–10 win over Vanderbilt on September 9, 2006. However, two weeks later against a very strong Arkansas team, he would miss three field goals in a 24–23 overtime loss, including the game-tying extra point. Christensen returned to the role the following week against Florida and except for two extra points against Florida International. Tiffin would be benched for the remainder of the season.

In 2007, he won the starting placekicking role over Christensen. The highlight of his sophomore year was when he went 4–4 in field goal attempts (39, 51, 29, 50) in a losing effort against Mississippi State. He was only the second kicker in Alabama football history to make two 50+ yard field goals in a game, the other being his father. His four kicks were Alabama's only points of the game. He finished the 2007 season converting all 36 extra point attempts and 25 of 34 field goal attempts.

In the 2008 Chick-fil-A College Kickoff, Tiffin kicked a 54–yard field goal, his career long, in a 34–10 victory over #9-ranked Clemson. He finished the season with 20 of 29 field goals and a semifinalist for the Lou Groza Award.

For the 2009 season, he was 30 for 35 on field goal attempts for 87.9 percent. After kicking a field goal against LSU, he became Alabama's all-time leading scorer with 350 points. That year, he was named Lou Groza Award "Star of the Week" three times and was a finalist for the Groza. In mid-December, Tiffin was named to the Associated Press All-American Team along with five other Crimson Tide players.

Professional career

Cleveland Browns
Tiffin was given a tryout with the Cleveland Browns as an undrafted free agent and agreed to a rookie free agent deal on May 3, 2010. He was waived/injured on May 18 and reverted to injured reserve. He was released from injured reserve with an injury settlement on May 26.

Personal life
Tiffin, born in Muscle Shoals, Alabama, is the son of Mia Michelle (née Self) and Van Leigh Tiffin. His father, known as Van, was a former Crimson Tide kicker who was the hero of the 1985 Iron Bowl against rival Auburn. Leigh Tiffin graduated from Muscle Shoals High School.

Tiffin married Baylee Ann Ellson. They have a daughter, Ava Bayleigh; their son Van Leigh III was born January 5, 2013.

References

External links
 Alabama Crimson Tide football bio

1988 births
Living people
People from Muscle Shoals, Alabama
Players of American football from Alabama
American football placekickers
Alabama Crimson Tide football players
Cleveland Browns players